Puerto Rico Highway 206 (PR-206) is a connector in Cayey, Puerto Rico that bypasses the downtown area of Cayey, making easier for drivers who do not want to access the congested area of the business center to directly go from Puerto Rico Highway 1 to Puerto Rico Highway 14 to Aibonito, Puerto Rico. Like Puerto Rico Highway 203 and future Puerto Rico Highway 204, PR-206 has two lanes per direction and is about 8 km long.

Major intersections

See also

 List of highways numbered 206

References

External links
 

206
Cayey, Puerto Rico